Dominique Scholten (born 6 April 1988) is a Dutch footballer who plays as a midfielder for BVC '12 in the Eerste Klasse.

Playing career
Scholten is a midfielder who was born in Nijmegen and made his debut in professional football, being part of the NEC Nijmegen squad in the 2006–07 season.

For the second half of the 2008–09 season, Scholten was on loan at TOP Oss. In May 2009 he signed for three seasons at the club. In June 2011 he had the contract dissolved and he signed a two-year contract with Achilles '29 from Groesbeek. There, he won the title in 2012, making Scholten the first footballer ever to win the Topklasse Sunday twice. The same season, Achilles '29 managed to win the general lower leagues championship after two games against SV Spakenburg. Scholten was a starter in both games. Scholten also won the title in his third season in the Topklasse. This also made him the first player to win the Topklasse Sunday three times.

After his second season in Groesbeek, he signed a two-year deal with SV Spakenburg. In 2016, he moved to JVC Cuijk and a year later to BVC '12.

Managerial career
In the 2006–07 season he started coaching youth teams at his former club NEC. In December 2009, Scholten started his own football academy. Scholten was active as a coach at the NEC/FC Oss academy from 2011. In addition, he worked in sports marketing for NOC/NSF between 2014 and 2017. In the 2016–17 season, he was head of Achilles '29 regional youth academy. In 2017, he became head of youth scouting and general affairs manager at the NEC/FC Oss academy. On 5 February 2020 it was announced that Scholten would become manager of the Twente academy from 1 April 2020.

References

1988 births
Living people
Dutch footballers
Dutch football managers
NEC Nijmegen players
TOP Oss players
Achilles '29 players
SV Spakenburg players
Eerste Divisie players
Derde Divisie players
Footballers from Nijmegen
Association football midfielders
NEC Nijmegen non-playing staff
TOP Oss non-playing staff
FC Twente non-playing staff
JVC Cuijk players